Charles Nordmann (1881–1940) was a French astronomer.

Publications 

 Einstein et l'univers: Une lueur dans le mystère des choses (1921)

External links
 
 
 

1881 births
1940 deaths
20th-century French astronomers
Place of birth missing